Actinopus cucutaensis is a species of mygalomorph spiders in the family Actinopodidae. It is found Colombia.

References

cucutaensis
Spiders described in 1941